Floyd B. Bartlett, known professionally as Benny Bartlett or Bennie Bartlett (August 16, 1924 – December 26, 1999), was an American child actor, musician, and later a member of the long-running feature film series The Bowery Boys.

Biography

Career
Benny Bartlett's first stage role was when he was ten days old. He became a musical prodigy, playing the trumpet at age four, directing and singing with his own dance orchestra on radio. He made his debut in motion pictures in 1935, appearing in the RKO musical Millions in the Air (1935), in which he had a piano specialty. The next year he appeared in a short for Paramount, singing "An Old-Fashioned Mill," which he had composed at the age of nine. The studio signed him to a contract soon afterward. Paramount had plans for Bartlett: syndicated columnist Mollie Merrick reported that the "eight-year-old" Bartlett (he was really 11) would star in the title role of Tom Sawyer, Detective  opposite co-star Elizabeth Patterson. The project was shelved—perhaps because Paramount had already fudged Bartlett's age—and the film was ultimately made with Billy Cook as Sawyer and new find Donald O'Connor as Huckleberry Finn. Bartlett began appearing with many of Paramount's biggest stars, and became such a hot property that he was often loaned out to other studios. Columbia featured him in an Andy Clyde short, Swing, You Swingers! (1938), in which he played an adolescent bandleader; he received billing as "Benny Bartlett and His Band."

Later career
By the early 1940s, Bartlett had outgrown child roles and was playing incidental parts in feature films like Thank Your Lucky Stars (1943, as a theater call boy). He was also working in Monogram's East Side Kids comedies.

Bartlett joined the military during World War II. After his enlistment was over, he resumed his acting career at PRC, where he co-starred in the Gas House Kids comedies, an imitation of The Bowery Boys with Our Gang alumni Carl "Alfalfa" Switzer and Tommy Bond. Bartlett was billed second and was quite prominent in the Gas House Kids vehicles; he played his trumpet in Gas House Kids Go West (1947). He might have continued there indefinitely, but the PRC studio was absorbed by a larger company and the series was discontinued. William Beaudine, who had directed Bartlett in Gas House Kids Go West, remembered Bartlett's comic skills and recruited him for the Bowery Boys. He was usually billed as "Bennie Bartlett" (and once, erroneously, as "David Bartlett," mistaken for co-star David Gorcey).

Bartlett left the series in 1949 and was replaced by Buddy Gorman, a utility player in the East Side Kids/Bowery Boys franchises. When Gorman left the series to get married in 1951, Bartlett returned. He remained with the series until 1955, but with his participation and dialogue sharply curtailed. Leo Gorcey even addressed him facetiously on screen as "No Lines" and "Blabbermouth,"  and in one film (Paris Playboys) he had no dialogue at all. Bartlett did try to break away from the series (he has a bit in the 1954 Alfred Hitchcock thriller Rear Window, and he accepted small roles on television). He may have stayed with the Bowery Boys as a favor to director Edward Bernds, or perhaps Bartlett's contract simply ran out; in any event, when Bernds left the series after Dig That Uranium, so did Bennie Bartlett.

He gave up his acting career in 1958 and became a professional realtor, reverting to his given name of Floyd B. Bartlett.

Selected filmography

 Millions in the Air (1935) - Kid Pianist
 Timothy's Quest (1936) - Jimmy
 The Sky Parade (1936) - Jimmie Allen - Age 9 (uncredited)
 Thirteen Hours by Air (1936) - Waldemar Pitt III
 The Princess Comes Across (1936) - Ship's Bellhop (uncredited)
 Poppy (1936) - Boy (uncredited)
 The Texas Rangers (1936) - David
 Three Married Men (1936) - Percy Mullins
 Time Out for Romance (1937) - Orville Healy
 Maid of Salem (1937) - Timothy - Her Son
 Let Them Live (1937) - Mike
 Easy Living (1937) - Newsboy (uncredited)
 Exclusive (1937) - Boy (uncredited)
 Danger – Love at Work (1937) - Junior Pemberton
 Bulldog Drummond's Revenge (1937) - Cabin Boy
 Penrod and His Twin Brother (1938) - Chuck
 Sons of the Legion (1938) - Red O'Flaherty
 Gang Bullets (1938) - Billy Jones
 Just Around the Corner (1938) - Milton Ramsby
 The Great Man Votes (1939) - Davy McCarthy
 The Family Next Door (1939) - Rufus Pierce
 Mickey the Kid (1939) - Joe Fisher
 Honeymoon in Bali (1939) - Jack, Singing Telegram Boy
 What a Life (1939) - 'Butch' Williams
 Our Neighbors – The Carters (1939) - Junior Carter
 Alias the Deacon (1940) - Willie Clark
 Let's Make Music (1941) - Tommy
 Meet John Doe (1941) - Red (uncredited)
 Men of Boys Town (1941) - Older Homeless Boy (uncredited)
 Tillie the Toiler (1941) - Glennie
 Code of the Outlaw (1942) - Tim Hardin
 Between Us Girls (1942) - Boy (uncredited)
 Kid Dynamite (1943) - Beanie Miller
 He Hired the Boss (1943) - Jimmy
 Clancy Street Boys (1943) - Benny
 Follow the Band (1943) - Cootie
 A Lady Takes a Chance (1943) - Henry (uncredited)
 Nobody's Darling (1943) - Julius aka The Deacon
 Fired Wife (1943) - Bellboy (uncredited)
 Thank Your Lucky Stars (1943) - Page Boy (uncredited)
 Her Adventurous Night (1946) - Horace
 The Adventures of Don Coyote (1947) - Ted Riley
 Gas House Kids Go West (1947) - Orvie
 Gas House Kids in Hollywood (1947) - Orvie
 Big Town After Dark (1947) - McGonigle (uncredited)
 Angels' Alley (1948) - Harry 'Jag' Harmon
 Heart of Virginia (1948) - 'Breezy' Brent
 Jinx Money (1948) - Butch
 The Babe Ruth Story (1948) - Newsboy (uncredited)
 Smugglers' Cove (1948) - Butch
 Trouble Makers (1948) - Butch
 Fighting Fools (1949) - Butch
 Hold That Baby! (1949) - Butch
 Any Number Can Play (1949) - Tommy Smith (uncredited)
 Angels in Disguise (1949) - Butch
 Master Minds (1949) - Butch
 Cheaper by the Dozen (1950) - Joe Scales (uncredited)
 Southside 1-1000 (1950) - Eddie, Bellboy
 Crazy Over Horses (1951) - Butch
 Hold That Line (1952) - Butch (Credited as David Bartlett)
 Belles on Their Toes (1952) - 'Bubber' Beasley (uncredited)
 Here Come the Marines (1952) - Butch
 Feudin' Fools (1952) - Butch
 No Holds Barred (1952) - Butch
 Jalopy (1953) - Butch
 The Girls of Pleasure Island (1953) - Marine (uncredited)
 Loose in London (1953) - Butch
 Clipped Wings (1953) - Butch
 Private Eyes (1953) - Butch
 Paris Playboys (1954) - Butch
 The Bowery Boys Meet the Monsters (1954) - Butch
 Rear Window (1954) - Man with Miss Torso (uncredited)
 Jungle Gents (1954) - Butch
 Bowery to Bagdad (1955) - Butch
 High Society (1955) - Butch
 Spy Chasers (1955) - Butch
 Jail Busters (1955) - Butch
 Dig That Uranium (1956) - Butch

References

Further reading
 Dye, David. Child and Youth Actors: Filmography of Their Entire Careers, 1914-1985. Jefferson, NC: McFarland & Co., 1988, pp. 11–12.
 Holmstrom, John. The Moving Picture Boy: An International Encyclopaedia from 1895 to 1995, Norwich, Michael Russell, 1996, pp. 151–152.

External links

Benny Bartlett at Classic Movie Kids

1924 births
American male film actors
1999 deaths
People from Independence, Kansas
20th-century American male actors
American military personnel of World War II